Bigach (from , Qiğaş – curved) is an impact crater in Kazakhstan.

It is 8 km in diameter and the age is estimated to be 5 ± 3 million years (Pliocene or Miocene). The crater is exposed at the surface.

References 

Impact craters of Kazakhstan
Miocene impact craters
Pliocene